The pidyon haben or redemption of the first-born (if male and not by caesarean)
is a mitzvah in Judaism whereby a Jewish firstborn son is "redeemed" by use of silver coins. Interpretations differ in what the firstborn son is to be redeemed from, ranging from being redeemed from their firstborn status, which garnered negative connotations after the Ten Plagues, or their obligation to serve as a priest.

The redemption is attained by paying five silver coins to a kohen (a patrilineal descendant of the priestly family of Aaron), on behalf of one's firstborn son.

Pidyon haben is a relatively rare ceremony. A family does not perform the ceremony if its firstborn is either a girl, or born by caesarian section, or preceded by a miscarriage, or if either grandfather is a kohen or a Levite.

Biblical references
In the Hebrew Bible the laws (see mitzvah) concerning the redemption of the first-born male are referred to in Exodus, Numbers and Leviticus:

The redemption price for firstborn non-Levites was set at 5 shekels:

Principles
The Shulchan Aruch states that when a Jewish woman gives birth to a firstborn male by natural means,
then the child must be "redeemed".
The father
of the child must "redeem" the child from a known kohen
representing the original Temple priesthood, for the sum of five silver shekels, or equivalent in  country's currency (if it has silver currency of the correct weight). The procedure does not apply when the father is a kohen or Levite, and does not normally apply when the mother is the daughter of one.

This redemption ceremony is performed when at least thirty days have passed since the child's birth. If the 31st day falls on Shabbat or a festival, the redemption is delayed, because any sort of business transaction is not allowed on those days.
The elapsed days are counted from sunset to sunset, and the day of birth counts as the first day. While the redemption could be performed immediately after dark on the 31st night, it is usually done the next day; but if the 31st day is a fast day, it is done the previous night, so that it can be accompanied by a festive meal.
It is also possible to hold the ceremony on the 30th day itself, if it will be impossible to perform it the next day, so long as at least one synodic month has passed since the moment of birth.

Exemptions
If a woman gives birth to a second son naturally when the first son was born by caesarean section, that child is not redeemed either.
Additionally, a first-born male does not require redemption if his birth was preceded by an earlier miscarriage by the mother that occurred after the third month of pregnancy. However, if the miscarriage occurred during the first 40 days of pregnancy, redemption is required. If the previous miscarriage occurred after forty days, but before the fetus developed distinguishing characteristics, redemption of the first-born is still required, but the blessing said by the father is omitted.

Levites, including kohanim, do not redeem their children through the pidyon haben ceremony. The reason is that the Levites, as substitutes for the first-born, are pledged to minister and assist the kohanim in divine service, and cannot be redeemed from this service obligation.

The first-born son from a Levite's daughter is not redeemed;
likewise the first-born son of a kohen's daughter, as long as the father is Jewish.

Ceremony

In the traditional ceremony, the father brings the child to the kohen and recites a formula, or responds to ritual questions, indicating that this is the Israelite mother's firstborn son and he has come to redeem him as commanded in the Torah. If the family is Sephardic, the kohen asks the mother if the child is indeed her firstborn son and if she did not miscarry in the past. The kohen asks the father which he would rather have, the child or the five silver shekels which he must pay. The father states that he prefers the child to the money, then he recites a blessing and hands over five silver coins (or an equivalent amount of total silver). The kohen holds the coins over the child and declares that the redemption price is received and accepted in place of the child. He then blesses the child. (Note: The kohen would not receive the child if the father would refuse to redeem the boy. The function of the question is merely to formally endear the mitzvah to the father.)

The ceremony traditionally takes place before a minyan of 10 men. The child is sometimes presented on a silver tray, surrounded by jewelry lent for the occasion by women in attendance. This is to contrast with the golden calf, when gold and jewelry was used for a sinful purpose.

The event starts by beginning a festive meal (unlike a brit milah or wedding where the meal comes after the ceremony). If the family is Sephardic, the event starts with the ceremony. Guests in some places are given cloves of garlic and cubes of sugar to take home: these strongly flavored foods can be used to flavor a large quantity of food which will in some sense extend the mitzvah of participation in the ceremony to all who eat them.

If a first-born son reaches bar mitzvah age without having been redeemed, he is responsible for arranging the mitzvah himself as soon as possible.

Coins
Contemporary religious authorities believe that the Shekel HaKodesh (Holy Shekel) of the Temple was larger and of purer silver content than the standard shekel used for trade in ancient Israel. Halakha requires that the coins used have a requisite total amount of actual silver. There are varying opinions as to the correct amount of silver, they fall in between 96.15 grams and 102 grams. Coins which do not contain the requisite amount of silver do not result in a valid redemption.

The Israeli Mint has minted two sets of coins for this purpose: an edition of 20.57 gram silver commemorative coins, five of which would come to 102 grams of silver,
and a special edition 26 gram silver commemorative coins, five of which would come to 130 grams of silver. Pre-1936 American silver dollars (commonly known as Morgan dollars or Peace dollars) weigh 26.73 grams of 90% silver content and hence contain 24.06g of pure silver, although such coins have become increasingly rare (modern U.S. coins contain no silver). Four American Silver Eagle coins, specially minted coins sold to collectors and investors which contain 31.1035 grams of 99.9% pure silver, or five of the above-mentioned specially minted silver coins of Israel are commonly used for pidyon haben in the United States. One may use silver bullion as well; it is not necessary for it to be a coin per se.

Moreover, it is not mandatory to redeem the son in silver coins, and the ceremony can be held using any object worth the same value as five silver coins in the same day, other than banknotes, which, according to the Shulchan Aruch, are considered to be a promissory note, that is not acceptable for the ceremony.

Although the silver coins are the payment to the kohen under torah law and are one of the twenty-four kohanic gifts, they are sometimes returned by the kohen to the family as a gift for the child, although halachic authorities stipulate that, for the pidyon to be valid, the choice of returning the coins as a gift rest  upon the kohen whereas pressuring the kohen to do so would render the redemption invalid.

Pidyon Certificate
Some kohens officiating for the pidyon ceremony will present the father with a "Pidyon HaBen Certificate" of the pidyon transaction, the certificate will usually be framed for display and may serve as a receipt (and evidence) that the transaction was done according to halacha (i.e. the kohen was not pressured to return the coins), with the kohen and two witnesses ("Eidim") affixing their signatures at the time of the ceremony.

Women and pidyon haben
The question of a bat kohen accepting pidyon haben money on her own behalf
is not done in practice per a lengthy responsum on the topic by Joseph Saul Nathanson.

Traditional Jewish interpretation

According to the traditional rabbinic interpretation, in the early part of the Bible, as recorded in the Book of Genesis, the duties of a priest fell upon the eldest son of each family. The first-born was to be dedicated to God in order to perform this task. [Bereishis Rabbah 63:13; Zevachim 112; Bechoros 4; Rashi, Bereishis 25:31]

Following the Israelite Exodus from Egypt, after the nation had sinned with the golden calf, the priesthood was taken away from the first-borns, and given to the Tribe of Levi, specifically to the kohanim, that is: High Priest Aaron, his children, and their descendants. At the same time it was instituted that the first born of each family should be redeemed; i.e. they would be bought back from the dedication to God that would previously have been required of them. Levites were substituted for the first-born and wholly given to divine service:

See also
 Fast of the Firstborn

Footnotes

References

External links

 
 
 
 

Birth in Judaism
Hebrew words and phrases in the Hebrew Bible
Hebrew words and phrases in Jewish law
Jewish life cycle
Judaism and children
Positive Mitzvoth